State Highway 54 (SH 54) is a New Zealand state highway in the Manawatū District in the North Island. The highway connects the Manawatu agricultural town of Feilding to the New Zealand state highway network and forms an alternative route to SH 1 and SH 3 between the North Island Volcanic Plateau and Palmerston North.

Route
It steeply descends to cross the Rangitikei River before winding along the eastern side of the Rangitikei Valley. The route then exits the valley and heads to Cheltenham, where it meets Kimbolton Road at a T-junction.

From Cheltenham, the route turns south on to Kimbolton Road and proceeds to Feilding, where it then parallels the North Island Main Trunk railway line for a short distance along Aorangi Street and Waughs Road. It then leaves Waughs Road and travels south along Camerons Line and east along Milson Line, before leaving Milson Line and turning south on Kairanga-Bunnythorpe Road.

Route changes
SH 54 previously began further north at Mangaweka, leaving  on Ruahine Road and travelling via Rangiwahia to Kimbolton, where it travelled along Kimbolton Road to Cheltenham before continuing along its current route to Feilding and beyond.  SH 54 was shifted to the Cheltenham-Hunterville Road (its current route between SH 1 and Cheltenham) in the 1990s.

See also
List of New Zealand state highways

References

External links
 New Zealand Transport Agency

54
Manawatu District
Transport in Manawatū-Whanganui